Alsea, S.A.B. de C.V., known as Alsea, is a Mexican multi-brand restaurant operator based in Mexico City, Mexico. It was founded as a holding company in 1997. Its operating portfolio includes fast-food, casual dining, and cafeteria type restaurant chains located in Mexico, South America and Europe. It is one of the largest foodservice companies in Mexico according to CNN Expansión.

Some of the restaurant chains that Alsea operates are Starbucks, Burger King, Vips, Domino's Pizza, Italianni's, Chili's,   California Pizza Kitchen, P. F. Chang's, and The Cheesecake Factory.

Alsea reported revenues of US$1.7 billion for 2014. It operates more than 3,093 units of restaurant chains in Mexico, Spain, Chile, Argentina, Colombia, Brazil, The Netherlands & France and employs more than 60,000 people. 
Alsea is listed on the Mexican Stock Exchange and is a constituent of the IPC, the main benchmark index of Mexican stocks.

In 2014, Alsea acquired the Mexican restaurant chain Vips and the Spanish Grupo Zena.

In 2019, Alsea acquired the rights to operate and develop establishments of the Starbucks brand in the Netherlands, Belgium, Luxembourg (BENELUX) and France.

Brands portfolio 
Alsea has the rights to manage and open restaurants from these brands as follows:

Recent news
In February 2019, Alsea de CV : ACQUIRES THE RIGHTS FOR THE DEVELOPMENT OF THE BRAND STARBUCKS IN THE NETHERLANDS, BELGIUM AND LUXEMBOURG.

In September 2013, Alsea acquired 362 Walmex restaurants Vips and El Porton for around $626 million.

References

External links

Food and drink companies based in Mexico City
Companies listed on the Mexican Stock Exchange
Restaurant groups in Mexico
Restaurants established in 1997
1997 establishments in Mexico
Holding companies established in 1997